Claude-Arnaud Rivenet (born 13 December 1972) is a French former professional footballer who played as a striker.

Career
Born in Lille, Rivenet played for Lyon B, Lyon, Gueugnon, Troyes, Amiens, La Louvière, Mons, Kortrijk and Saint-Priest.

After retiring as a player, Rivenet began working for OL TV.

References

1972 births
Living people
French footballers
Olympique Lyonnais players
FC Gueugnon players
ES Troyes AC players
Amiens SC players
R.A.A. Louviéroise players
R.A.E.C. Mons players
K.V. Kortrijk players
AS Saint-Priest players
Ligue 1 players
Ligue 2 players
Championnat National players
Championnat National 2 players
Belgian Pro League players
Association football forwards
French expatriate footballers
French expatriates in Belgium
Expatriate footballers in Belgium